Viktor Davidovich Kupreichik (Viktar Davydavič Kuprejčyk; 3 July 1949 – 22 May 2017) was a Belarusian chess grandmaster.

Career 
At the beginning of his career, he won the individual gold medal at the 15th World Student Team Chess Championship in Ybbs in 1968 at age 19. 
He won the Belarusian Chess Championship in 1972 and 2003.

In 1980, he was awarded the Grandmaster title.

He also placed first at Wijk aan Zee (Masters' tournament) 1977, Kirovakan 1978 (jointly), Reykjavík 1980, Plovdiv 1980, Medina del Campo 1980, and Hastings International Chess Congress in 1981/82. In 2002 Kupreichik won the Group B of the first edition of the Aeroflot Open.
In 2010, he won the European Seniors’ Rapid Championship.

A player of real fighting chess, he would often lead tournaments in the early stages and then run out of stamina and lose heavily in the last few rounds; for example, at each of the Soviet Championships of 1979 and 1980, he won 5 consecutive games, but only finished 6th on both occasions.

He died on 22 May 2017.

Family 
His niece is Anastasia Sorokina.

References

External links
 
 Viktor D Kupreichik chess games at 365Chess.com
 

1949 births
2017 deaths
Chess grandmasters
Belarusian chess players
Soviet chess players
Chess players from Minsk